Moineau (means "sparrow") is a French surname:

 Jules Moineau (anarchist), anarchist and signatory of the Manifesto of the Sixteen
 Julien Moineau (1903–1980), French road bicycle racer

See also 

 Salmson-Moineau (or Salmson-Moineau S.M.1), a French armed three-seat biplane long range reconnaissance aircraft

French-language surnames
Surnames from nicknames